Acutalibacter is a Gram-positive, strictly anaerobic, chemoorganotrophic, mesophilic and acidogenic genus of bacteria from the family of Oscillospiraceae.

References

Clostridiaceae
Bacteria genera